Vizard is a surname of Norman origin, derived from "Wisc(h)ard", from the old Norman/French personal name Guisc(h)ard.

Notable people with the surname include:

 Brian Vizard (born 1959), former American rugby union player
 Steve Vizard (born 1956), Australian media personality, businessman and philanthropist
 Ted Vizard (1889–1973), former Welsh footballer and manager
 Walter Vizard (1861–1929), English cricketer

Further reading
http://www.surnamedb.com/Surname/Vizard

http://www.ancestry.co.uk/name-origin?surname=vizard

Surnames of French origin
Surnames of Belgian origin
French-language surnames